Baraliris was an imagined Illyrian ruler, who (according to Tertullian)  after seeing a sign in a dream, embarked on a series of military victories which allowed him to extend Illyrian rule over the Molossians and other tribes, as far as the frontiers of Macedon.  Probably the same as Bardyllis.

References
Tertullian, A Treatise On the Soul, chap. XLVI.

Illyrian people